Burning Man is an event held annually in the western United States at Black Rock City.

Burning Man may also refer to:

 "Burning Man" (song), a song by Dierks Bentley featuring Brothers Osborne
 Burning Man (film), a 2011 film
 "The Burning Man" (The Twilight Zone), an episode of The Twilight Zone
 Another name for the Wicker man